The Big Red Software Company Limited, doing business as Big Red Software, was a British video game developer based in Leamington Spa, England, that was founded by Paul Ranson in October 1989.

History 
Big Red Software was incorporated on 16 October 1989 by Paul Ranson, and was based in Leamington Spa, England. In their early years, they focused on the 8-bit home computer game market, especially for ZX Spectrum and Amstrad CPC. During this time, they formed a close relationship with Codemasters, who published many of their games. This relationship was sufficiently close that Codemasters turned to them to develop the next Dizzy game after the series' creators, the Oliver Twins, moved onto other projects. The resulting game, Magicland Dizzy, was a critical and commercial success. When Retro Gamer released a special retrospective edition of Your Sinclair in 2004, they rated it the 12th best game for ZX Spectrum of all time. Other games released in collaboration with Codemasters include further Dizzy games, the Seymour series, and the PC port of Micro Machines.

In the mid-1990s, as the industry moved away from the older 8-bit computers, Big Red Software started developing games such as Tank Commander and Big Red Racing for MS-DOS, with both these titles being published by Domark. The latter two were merged into Domark to create Eidos Interactive on 31 May 1996.

Games developed

References 

Defunct video game companies of the United Kingdom
Video game companies established in 1989
Video game companies disestablished in 1996
Video game development companies